Lachamp is a former commune in the Lozère department in southern France. On 1 January 2019, it was merged into the new commune Lachamp-Ribennes.

Geography
The Colagne forms part of the commune's western border.

See also
Communes of the Lozère department

References

Former communes of Lozère